Streptomyces showdoensis is a bacterium species from the genus of Streptomyces which has been isolated from soil in Shōdoshima, Japan. Streptomyces showdoensis produces terferol, actinomycin and showdomycin.

See also 
 List of Streptomyces species

References

Further reading

External links
Type strain of Streptomyces showdoensis at BacDive -  the Bacterial Diversity Metadatabase	

showdoensis
Bacteria described in 1964